The 1958 New Mexico Lobos football team represented the University of New Mexico in the Skyline Conference during the 1958 NCAA University Division football season.  In their first season under head coach Marv Levy, the Lobos compiled a 7–3 record (5–1 against Skyline opponents), finished second in the conference, and outscored all opponents by a total of 210 to 185.

The team's statistical leaders included Chuck Roberts with 337 passing yards, Don Perkins with 621 rushing yards, and Don Black with 303 receiving yards and 54 points scored. Perkins went on to play eight seasons for the Dallas Cowboys and played in six Pro Bowls.

Schedule

References

New Mexico
New Mexico Lobos football seasons
New Mexico Lobos football